Djoulacolon is an arrondissement of Kolda in Kolda Region in Senegal.

References 

Arrondissements of Senegal